Balta is a commune located in Mehedinți County, Romania. It is composed of seven villages: Balta, Coada Cornetului, Costești, Gornovița, Nevățu, Prejna and Sfodea. It is situated in the historical region of Oltenia.

References

Communes in Mehedinți County
Localities in Oltenia